Metcalf Ross ( – 2 January 1858) was an English master printer and sometime poet/songwriter in Tyneside. He was born in Sunderland, Tyne and Wear.

There are two noted works by Ross.

The first, a song, is given different titles in the different chapbooks. It is entitled "A New Year's Carol (A) (For the Fishwives of Newcastle)" - by Fordyce  on page 138 of The Tyne Songster of 1840, and "The Fishwives Carol" – by France on page 180 of Songs of the Bards of the Tyne of 1850.

The second work, a poem, entitled "Address to  Robert Emery" – allegedly written as a tribute on the death of Emery  in 1870 – and given on page 290 of Allan's Illustrated Edition of Tyneside Songs and Readings of 1891.

See also 
 Geordie dialect words
 W & T Fordyce
 P. France & Co.
 France's Songs of the Bards of the Tyne - 1850

References

External links
 TheTyne Songster
 Songs of the Bards of the Tyne
 Allan’s Illustrated Edition of Tyneside songs and readings

English male poets
English songwriters
People from Sunderland
People from Newcastle upon Tyne (district)
Musicians from Tyne and Wear
Geordie songwriters
1750s births
1858 deaths
19th-century English musicians